Tanaorhinus formosanus is a species of moth of the family Geometridae first described by Okano in 1959. It is found in Taiwan.

References

Moths described in 1959
Geometrinae